Kostiantyn Petrovich Stepankov (by name of Kostiantyn Petrovich Voloshchuk; 3 June 1928 – 22 July 2004) was a Ukrainian soviet actor. He appeared in more than fifty films between 1958 and 1999. He was a member of the jury at the 11th Moscow International Film Festival.

Biography
Kostiantyn Stepankov was born in a village Pechesky, Khmelnytskyi Oblast in Western Ukraine in family of the priest. In 1950-53 he studied in the Karpenko-Karyi Memorial Kyiv Institute of Theatrical Arts

Selected filmography

 Pavel Korchagin (1956)
 The Dream (1964)
 The Stone Cross (1968)
 Annychka (1968)
 Commisars (1970)
 The White Bird Marked with Black (1970)
 Zakhar Berkut (1971)
 Maryna (1974)
 How the Steel Was Tempered (1975)
 Hatred (1975)
 Babylon XX (1979)
 The Gadfly (1980)
 Dudaryky (1980)
 Yaroslav Mudry (1982)
 The Legend of Princess Olga (1983)
 Battle of Moscow (1985)
 Ashik Kerib (1988)
 Stone Soul (1988)
 The Mountains are Smoking (1989)
 Miracle in the Land of Oblivion (1991)
 Carpathian gold (1991)
 Cherry nights (1992)
 Judenkreis, or Eternal Wheel (1996)
 As a blacksmith was looking for happiness (1999)

Accolades
 People's Artist of the USSR
 People's Artist of Ukraine
 Order of Merit (Second Class, 2003)
 Order of Merit (Third Class, 1998)

References

External links

1928 births
2004 deaths
Soviet male film actors
Ukrainian male film actors
Ukrainian male voice actors
People's Artists of the USSR
Recipients of the title of People's Artists of Ukraine
Recipients of the Order of Merit (Ukraine), 2nd class
Recipients of the Order of Merit (Ukraine), 3rd class
Recipients of the Lenin Komsomol Prize
Kyiv National I. K. Karpenko-Kary Theatre, Cinema and Television University alumni
Dovzhenko Film Studios actors
Deaths from cancer in Ukraine
Deaths from pancreatic cancer
Laureates of the Oleksandr Dovzhenko State Prize